Kargino (Qarğa) is a rural locality (a village) in Baygildinsky Selsoviet, Nurimanovsky District, Bashkortostan, Russia. The population was 51 as of 2010. There are 5 streets.

Geography 
Kargino is located 35 km southwest of Krasnaya Gorka (the district's administrative centre) by road. Bikmurzino is the nearest rural locality.

References 

Rural localities in Nurimanovsky District